Mabel Osgood Wright (January 26, 1859 – July 16, 1934) was an American author. She was an early leader in the Audubon movement who wrote extensively about nature and birds.

Early years and education
Mabel Osgood was the daughter of Samuel and Ellen Haswell (Murdock) Osgood. She was born in New York City on January 26, 1859, and was educated at home and in private schools.

Career
On September 25, 1884, she was married to James Osborne Wright, an Englishman; after an extended visit to England, the couple moved to Fairfield, Connecticut.

Wright's first printed work (apart from a few verses), was the essay "A New England May Day", which appeared in the New York Evening Post in 1893. This work was collected with other pieces into her first book, The Friendship of Nature, published by Macmillan in 1894. The following year, Wright released Birdcraft: A Field Book of Two Hundred Song, Game, and Water Birds.  A prototype of the modern field guide to birds for a popular audience, Birdcraft featured color reproductions from John James Audubon and other artists to illustrate species commonly encountered at home or in a neighboring park. A later edition credits Louis Agassiz Fuertes as a contributing artist.  Frank M. Chapman described it as "one of the first and most successful bird manuals."  Two years later, Wright's Citizen Bird: Scenes from Bird-life in Plain English for Beginners, a collaboration with Elliott Coues, appeared.

From its inception in 1899, Wright contributed to Chapman's Bird-Lore, co-editing its Audubon department with William Dutcher.  She served as a contributing editor until her death.  She helped organize the Connecticut Audubon Society, became its first president in 1898, and served for many years. From 1905 to 1928, Wright was a director of the National Association of Audubon Societies (now the National Audubon Society).  Wright became an associate member of the American Ornithologists' Union in 1895, and was one of the first three women raised to elective membership in 1901. Joining her were Florence Merriam Bailey and Olive Thorne Miller.  Wright pioneered bird protection by establishing Birdcraft Sanctuary in 1914, near her home in Fairfield.  The refuge is the oldest private songbird sanctuary in the United States.

From her beginnings as a writer about children, nature, and outdoor life, Wright's reception from the public was cordial. However, when she began to publish works of fiction, she concealed her identity as their author until they had won recognition independently, taking the pseudonym of "Barbara". Much of the material to which she gave attractive literary expression she found in the large garden at her home in Fairfield. Although Wright is remembered more for her nature writing, some aspects of her fiction are notable.  Some of these romances were unconventional in form, combining passages of fictional narrative with letters, diary entries, and nonfictional pieces of autobiography, social criticism, and gardening lore.  It is true that her fictional range was narrow, limited demographically to the upper classes of Manhattan and New England and emotionally to scenes of domestic piety and sentimentality. But her observations of changing social patterns (the "new magnates" of the new century and increased suburbanization) and of the growth of feminism are worthwhile. Her ambivalence toward the changing role of women is interesting, with sympathy on the one hand and shrill attacks on careerism on the other.

On July 16, 1934, she succumbed to hypertensive myocardial disease with angina, and died in Fairfield. She is buried in Oak Lawn Cemetery in that town.

Selected works

 
 
 
 
 
  In the 1911 reprint edition, no name appears on the title page save "The Gardener."
 
 
  Under the pseudonym "Barbara."
 
 
  Title page has "By Mabel Osgood Wright (Barbara)".
 

Mabel Osgood Wright's work also includes the following.  Several of the works of fiction first appeared under the pseudonym of "Barbara".

 Tommy-Anne and the Three Hearts: A Nature Story (1896)
 Wabeno, the Magician (1899), a sequel to Tommy-Anne
 The Dream Fox Story Book  (1900)
 Dogtown (1902)
 The Woman Errant (1904)
 The Open Window (1908)
 The Love that Lives (1911)
 The Stranger at the Gate (1913)
 My New York (1926)
 Eudora's Men (1931)

References

Bibliography

External links 

 
 
 
 

1859 births
1934 deaths
19th-century American novelists
19th-century American women writers
20th-century American non-fiction writers
20th-century American novelists
20th-century American women writers
American nature writers
American women non-fiction writers
American women novelists
Audubon movement
Novelists from Connecticut
Novelists from New York (state)
Women science writers
Writers from Fairfield, Connecticut
Writers from New York City